Groovin' High is an album by guitarist Kenny Burrell recorded in 1981 and released on the Muse label in 1984.

Track listing 
 "Groovin' High" (Dizzy Gillespie) – 5:33
 "Lament" (J. J. Johnson) – 6:17
 "If I Love Again" (Ben Oakland, Jack Murray) – 3:52
 "Spring Can Really Hang You Up the Most" (Tommy Wolf, Fran Landesman) – 3:29
 "Secret Love" (Sammy Fain, Paul Francis Webster) – 6:48
 "Peace" (Horace Silver) – 7:08
 "Someone to Light Up My Life" (Antônio Carlos Jobim, Vinicius de Moraes, Gene Lees) – 4:54

Personnel 
Kenny Burrell – guitar
Larry Ridley – bass
Ben Riley – drums

References 

Kenny Burrell albums
1984 albums
Muse Records albums